The Azerbaijani Land Forces are the land force component of the Azerbaijani Armed Forces. Since the fall of the Soviet Union, Azerbaijan has been trying to create professional, well trained, and mobile armed forces. Based on 2013 statistics, the country has about 56,850 ground force troops, with additional paramilitary forces of 15,000. In addition, there are 300,000 former service personnel who have had military service in the last fifteen years.

Reportedly, in wartime, the Army proper could call upon the support of the National Guard, the Internal Troops of Azerbaijan, and the State Border Service. The exact wartime command structure remains unclear.

History
During the Soviet period, Azerbaijan was part of the Transcaucasus Military District, whose forces in the republic were commanded by the 4th Army. The 4th Army consisted of three motor rifle divisions (the 23rd Guards Motor Rifle Division (MRD) at Ganja, the 60th Motor Rifle Division at Lankaran, and the 295th Motor Rifle Division in Baku) and army troops that included missile and air defence brigades and artillery and rocket regiments. Azerbaijan also hosted the 49th Arsenal of the Main Agency of Missiles and Artillery of the Ministry of Defense of the Russian Federation, which contained over 7,000 train-car loads of ammunition to the excess of one billion units. In addition, the 75th Motor Rifle Division, part of the 7th Guards Army, was in the Nakhchivan Autonomous Republic

In summer 1992, the Defense Ministry of Azerbaijan, following a resolution by the Azerbaijani president on the privatization of units and formations in Azerbaijani territory, forwarded an ultimatum demanding control over vehicles and armaments of the 135th and 139th motorized rifle regiments of the 295th Motor Rifle Division. The transfer of the property of the 4th Army (except for over half the equipment of the 366th Guards Motor Rifle Regiment of the 23rd Division captured by Armenian armed formations in 1992 during the regiment's withdrawal from Stepanakert) and the 49th Arsenal was completed in 1992. Thus, by the end of 1992, the Azerbaijani Government received arms and military hardware sufficient for approximately three motor rifle divisions with prescribed army units. The stores and equipment of the 75th Division were handed over to the Nakhchivan government. The former Division HQs may have contributed to the formation of corps headquarters.

Twenty-first century 
Azerbaijan reorganized its army, and has been preparing its armed forces for possible action against Armenian forces in Nagorno-Karabakh. Intermittent fighting continued, most recently breaking out into the 2020 Nagorno-Karabakh conflict.

Azerbaijan has contracted with Turkey for troop training to strengthen its armed forces. This is necessary in view of deficiencies that Jane's World Armies said in 2004 included huge problems in training, equipping and motivating its soldiers; corruption in its ranks; and a highly politicized officer corps. The Soviet Army tradition of dedovshchina, institutionalized hazing, appears to be continuing in the armed forces as of 2008. The quality and readiness of much of the army's equipment, Jane's said, is also a problem, as a decade of poor maintenance and chronic shortages of spare parts means that many systems are not operational, or cannibalised for parts. Azerbaijan has the second-highest military expenditure in CIS. Azerbaijan's defense spending is second only to Russia's within the Commonwealth of Independent States.

During the 2020 Nagorno-Karabakh conflict, the Azerbaijani army was widely accused of committing war crimes against Armenian soldiers and civilians. Human Rights Watch and Amnesty International both condemned Azerbaijan’s “indiscriminate” shelling of Armenian civilians, including the use of cluster munitions.  In addition, videos of Azerbaijani soldiers mistreating or executing captive Armenians were circulated online and received widespread condemnation.

Structure

Opposed by Armenian forces, the Azerbaijani military was forced back out of Nagorno-Karabakh and was significantly reorganised in the mid-1990s predominantly around brigades, though at least one division was reported as late as 2000. Manoeuvre formations have consistently stayed at a strength of around twenty brigades and regiments since 1995, though that has slowly risen recently. During the 1990s, these brigades may have included the 701st Motor Rifle Brigade (1st Army Corps), the 708th Motor Rifle Brigade (1st Army Corps), 130th Motor Rifle Brigade (1st Army Corps), 161st Motor Rifle Brigade (2nd Army Corps), 709th Motor Rifle Brigade (formerly the 23rd Motor Rifle Division), and the 112th Motor Rifle Brigade.

The Land Forces currently consist of five army corps:
  1st Army Corps also known as Barda Army Corps (deployed near Ganja ), currently led by Major General Hikmat Hasanov 
1st Motor Rifle Brigade
3rd Motor Rifle Brigade
9th Motor Rifle Brigade
10th Motor Rifle Brigade
15th Motor Rifle Brigade
17th Motor Rifle Brigade
  2nd Army Corps also known as Beylagan Army Corps (concentrated against Armenian occupied territories and part is deployed on the Azerbaijan-Iranian border), currently led by Major General Mais Barkhudarov
2nd Motor Rifle Brigade
4th Motor Rifle Brigade
6th Motor Rifle Brigade
8th Motor Rifle Brigade
13th Motor Rifle Brigade
14th Motor Rifle Brigade
18th Motor Rifle Brigade
  3rd Army Corps also known as Shamkir Army Corps (concentrated against Armenian occupied territories), currently led by Lieutenant General Rovshan Akbarov
7th Motor Rifle Brigade
11th Motor Rifle Brigade
12th Motor Rifle Brigade
16th Motor Rifle Brigade
19th Motor Rifle Brigade
20th Motor Rifle Brigade
  4th Army Corps also known as Baku Army Corps (covers Absheron Peninsula and the coast)
Motor Rifle Brigade
Motor Rifle Brigade
Motor Rifle Brigade
  Nakhchivan Separate Combined Arms Army (deployed in Nakhchivan ), currently led by Colonel General Karam Mustafayev
6th Army Corps

The IISS estimated in 2007 that the Azerbaijani regular army was 56,840 strong, probably basing this figure on Conventional Forces in Europe treaty data. It attributes to the army five corps headquarters, 23 motor rifle brigades, one artillery brigade, one multiple rocket launcher brigade, and one anti-tank regiment. Of the five army corps, the 1st, 2nd, and 3rd Army Corps are concentrated against NK; part of 2nd is deployed on the Azerbaijan-Iranian border; the 4th covers the capital and the coast and the 5th is deployed exclusively in Nakhchivan. Following the 2020 war, and specifically during the Baku Victory Parade, experts noted that a 6th corps was created, in part due to the partial mobilization that occurred in the country during that 44-day period.

In addition, the Army maintains the following units:

  Azerbaijani Special Forces
Peacekeeping Battalion
Security Team
 Artillery Brigade
 Multiple Rocket Launcher Brigade
 Anti-Tank Regiment
Communication Brigade
Engineering Brigade
Logistics Brigade

Ranks

Commissioned officer ranks
The rank insignia of commissioned officers.

Other ranks
The rank insignia of non-commissioned officers and enlisted personnel.

Equipment

Service March
The service march of the Lane Forces is "Forward" (Marş "İrəli") also known as the "Soldier's Anthem" (Əsgər Marşı). The lyrics are based on that of the Regiment March, which is the official march of the Special Forces Command of Turkey. The lyrics of the march are as follows:

The march was written by Cavanşir Quliyev. It is performed at all military parades in Azerbaijan.

See also
Azerbaijani Armed Forces

References

Military of Azerbaijan
Armies by country
1992 establishments in Azerbaijan